YNK Interactive is a game publisher company founded in 2005 based in Orange County, California. A wholly owned subsidiary of YNK Korea, a Korea online game developer and publisher. YNK Interactive publishes English versions of game titles from YNK Korea that released titles such as Seal Online, Rohan Online, and K.O.S: The Secret Operations.

Current titles
Seal Online - The first title YNK Interactive published, it was released on November 19, 2007.
R.O.H.A.N.:Blood Feud - A popular MMORPG among fans.
K.O.S: The Secret Operations - The first online first-person shooter Game of YNK Interactive and YNK Korea.

Companies established in 2005
Video game publishers
Video game companies of the United States